Dmitry Mukhomediarov (born 24 May 1999) is a Russian road and track cyclist, who currently rides for UCI Continental team .

Major results

Track

2017
 1st  Team pursuit, UCI Junior World Track Championships (with Lev Gonov, Ivan Smirnov and Gleb Syritsa)
 1st  Team pursuit, European Junior Track Championships (with Lev Gonov, Ivan Smirnov and Gleb Syritsa)
 UCI World Cup
3rd Team pursuit, Minsk
 2nd Team pursuit, National Track Championships
2018
 2nd Team pursuit, National Track Championships
 3rd  Team pursuit, European Under-23 Track Championships
2019
 1st  Team pursuit, European Under-23 Track Championships
 3rd  Points race, European Games

Road
2017
 Tour du Pays de Vaud
1st Prologue & Stage 2
1st Mountains classification
2018
 3rd Overall Vuelta a Alicante

References

External links

1999 births
Living people
Russian male cyclists
Russian track cyclists
European Games bronze medalists for Russia
Cyclists at the 2019 European Games
European Games medalists in cycling
People from Kopeysk
Sportspeople from Chelyabinsk Oblast